Klarići is a village in Istria County, Croatia. Administratively it belongs to Buzet.

Geography 
It lies at the Northern part of Istria Peninsula, 17 km from Pazin and 5 km South from the centre of the settlement.

Historical population

Sources

External links 
Home page of Buzet
Home page of Buzet's Tourist Office

Municipalities of Croatia
Populated places in Istria County